John Clarke was a Scottish professional footballer. A centre forward, he played in the Football League for Bury, Blackpool and Luton Town.

Career
After starting his career in his native Scotland with Rangers, he joined Fairfield without having made any League appearances for the Gers. He signed for nearby Bury in 1896, making six League appearances for them before moving north-west to join Blackpool he made thirteen League appearances for the Seasiders, scoring six goals. He finished his career with Luton Town in 1897, making one League appearance for the Hatters.

References

19th-century births
Scottish footballers
Rangers F.C. players
Fairfield Athletic F.C. players
Bury F.C. players
Blackpool F.C. players
Luton Town F.C. players
Year of death missing
Association football forwards